Beacon Field Airport was an airport located in the Groveton area of Fairfax County, Virginia, United States, from the 1920s until its closure in 1959. One of the nation's earliest private airports, and particularly in the Washington DC Metropolitan Area, it received its name because it was the location of an airway beacon used to guide early airmail pilots. It later became a popular training site, complete with FBO, for pilots learning to fly after World War II on the G.I. Bill.

The site, originally an antebellum estate called City View, is now the location of a shopping center.

See also

 Hybla Valley Airport, a nearby associated defunct airport
 Washington-Virginia Airport, a prominent, privately owned and operated airport in the Washington D.C. area from 1947 to 1970

External links
 BeaconFieldAirport.com: website about the airport
 Abandoned & Little Known Airfields (Virginia page)

Defunct airports in Virginia
Airports disestablished in 1959
1959 disestablishments in Virginia